Diplomatic relations between Australia and Tuvalu were established in 1978, with the independence of Tuvalu, and both countries are members of the Commonwealth of Nations which share a head of state. Australia has had a High Commission in Funafuti since 2018. Tuvalu is not currently represented in Australia at the high commissioner or consular level.

History
Australia has strong ties with Tuvalu and was one of the three founding donating countries to the Tuvalu Trust Fund and continues as a major donor of aid and technical assistance to Tuvalu. The official currency of Tuvalu from 1966 to 1976 was the Australian dollar, which strengthens the economic bonds between the two countries in particular. Since 1976, Tuvalu began issuing its own coinage (see Tuvaluan dollar) but the country continues to use Australian banknotes as official currency, and the value of the Tuvaluan currency is directly tied to the Australian dollar. In this regard, the Tuvaluan dollar is similar to the Faroese króna's relationship to the Danish krone as the Tuvaluan dollar is not an independent currency but has been assigned an ISO 4217 currency code, although it is treated as equivalent to the Australian dollar.

In August 2009, Australia signed a Pacific Partnership for Development between Australia and Tuvalu at the Pacific Islands Forum Leaders held in Cairns, Australia. Australia was (along with New Zealand and the United Kingdom) one of the three founding donating countries to the Tuvalu Trust Fund.

Australia is a major aid donor to Tuvalu. In 1994, even before the Pacific Partnership between the two countries was signed, Australia donated a Pacific-class patrol boat (HMTSS Te Mataili) provided by Australia under the Pacific Patrol Boat Program for use by the Tuvaluan police force for search and rescue missions and maritime surveillance and fishery patrol. Australia has agreed to provide its maintenance until 2024 as well as training for its operation. Australia's Defence Cooperation Program supports Tuvalu's maritime police force with training, fresh water and supplies.  On 7 April 2019, Australia donated a Guardian-class patrol boat that was named HMTSS Te Mataili II, and which will be operated by the maritime surveillance unit of the Tuvalu Police Force.

The government of Australia responded to the 2011 Tuvalu drought by working with New Zealand to supply temporary desalination plants; Australia also provide water tanks as part of the longer-term solution for the storage of available fresh water.

Tuvaluans can participate in the Australian Pacific Seasonal Worker Program, which allows Pacific Islanders to obtain seasonal employment in the Australian agriculture industry, in particular cotton and cane operations; fishing industry, in particular aquaculture; and with accommodation providers in the tourism industry.

Technical and Vocational Skills Development (TVSD) in Tuvalu is supported by the Australian Pacific Training Coalition (APTC).

Australian High Commission in Tuvalu

In the 2018 Federal budget, Australia allocated funding to establish a High Commission in Tuvalu, becoming one of only two diplomatic missions in Tuvalu (the other being the Embassy of Taiwan). Prior to the appointment of the first resident high commissioner in October 2018, non-resident accreditation for Tuvalu was held by the Australian High Commission to Fiji (held by the High Commissioner from 1978 to 2014, and the Deputy High Commissioner from 2014 to 2018).

The new High Commission in Tuvalu Road, Vaiaku, Funafuti, was officially opened by Foreign Minister Payne on 7 February 2019.

High commissioners

See also
 Foreign relations of Tuvalu
 Foreign relations of Australia

References

External links
Australian High Commission Tuvalu

Tuvalu
Australia
 
Tuvalu and the Commonwealth of Nations